The 2005 Wales rugby union tour of North America was a series of matches played in June 2005 in North America by Wales national rugby union team. The Welsh team had an experimental line-up because their best players were involved in the 2005 British & Irish Lions tour to New Zealand at the time.

Squad
Wales coach Mike Ruddock named a 29-man squad for the tour, including seven uncapped players, four of whom were part of the Wales under-21 team that won the Grand Slam in the Six Nations. Despite the inclusion of incumbent captain Colin Charvis in the squad, centre Mark Taylor was named as captain for the tour.

Results

United States v Wales

Canada v Wales

References

External links

Wales
tour
Wales national rugby union team tours
rugby
rugby
Rugby union tours of the United States
Rugby union tours of Canada